The Bouncing Souls is the third full-length album by American punk rock band The Bouncing Souls, and was released by Epitaph Records.

Track listing
All songs by The Bouncing Souls.

 "Cracked" – 1:56
 "Say Anything" – 1:16
 "Kate Is Great" – 2:54
 "Low Life" – 1:16
 "Chunksong" (Timmy Chunks, The Bouncing Souls) – 1:08
 "East Side Mags" – 1:06
 "The Toilet Song" – 1:23
 "Single Successful Guy" – 1:58
 "Whatever I Want (Whatever That Is)" – 1:23
 "Serenity" – 2:25
 "Party At 174" – 1:53
 "Holiday Cocktail Lounge" – 2:01
 "The Screamer" – 1:57
 "East Coast! Fuck You!" – 1:01
 "I Like Your Eyes" – 1:02
 "Shark Attack" – 1:22

Personnel
Greg Attonito – vocals
Pete Steinkopf – guitar, backing vocals
Bryan Keinlen – bass, backing vocals, artwork
Shal Khichi – drums
Thom Wilson – engineer
Mike Ainsworth – assistant engineer
Eddy Shreyer – technician

References

The Bouncing Souls albums
1997 albums
Epitaph Records albums
Albums produced by Thom Wilson